The Beryozovka is a river in Sakha Republic, Russia. It is a right tributary of the Kolyma. Its source is in the Yukaghir Highlands.

References

Rivers of the Sakha Republic